Ode to Booker Ervin is an album by American trumpeter Ted Curson which was recorded in Helsinki and first released on the Finnish EMI Columbia label in 1970. The album features Curson with a band composed of local Finnish jazz musicians. The album is dedicated to tenor saxophonist Booker Ervin who died at the end of August 1970, a few days before the recording session.

Reception

Allmusic awarded the album 3 stars.

Track listing
All compositions by Ted Curson except as indicated
 "Ode to Booker Ervin" - 2:07
 "LSD Takes Holiday" - 5:43
 "Airi's Tune" - 7:41
 "Montreux" (Pentti Hietanen) - 6:38
 "Festival Blue" (Hietanen) - 6:43
 "Typical Ted" - 7:05
 "The Leopard" - 8:31

Personnel
Ted Curson - trumpet, pocket trumpet
Eero Koivistoinen - alto saxophone, tenor saxophone, soprano saxophone
Pentti Hietanen - piano, electric piano
Pekka Sarmanto - bass
Reino Laine - drums

References

1970 albums
EMI Records albums
Ted Curson albums